Samna Kola (also Romanized as Samnā Kolā) is a village in Talarpey Rural District, in the Central District of Simorgh County, Mazandaran Province, Iran. At the 2006 census, its population was 208, in 55 families.

References 

Populated places in Simorgh County